Wooddale is a settlement in Newfoundland and Labrador. The major industry of Wooddale is agriculture.

Populated places in Newfoundland and Labrador